Diyogha is a settlement in the Kavango East Region in the north of Namibia. Diyogha is served by the Roman Catholic Holy Family Parish in Andara.

References

Populated places in Kavango East